William Ingram may refer to:

Bill Ingram (1898–1943), American college football coach
Billy Ingram (born 1865), English footballer
W. K. Ingram (died 1981), Arkansas politician
William Ingram (priest) (1834–1901), Aglican priest and dean of Peterborough
Sir William Ingram, 1st Baronet (1847–1924), British publisher and MP
William Ayerst Ingram (1855–1913), British painter and member of the Newlyn School
William Alfred Ingram (1876–1944), British tennis player 
William T. Ingram (1913–2001), American theologian and president of Memphis Theological Seminary
William Austin Ingram (1924–2002), former United States federal judge from California
William Ingram (literature professor) (born 1930)
William Ingram (writer) (1930-2013), Welsh writer and actor
William E. Ingram Jr. (born 1948), United States Army Lieutenant General and Director of the Army National Guard